"One Man in My Heart" is a song by British synth-pop band the Human League, written by Neil Sutton and Philip Oakey. It was released as the second single from the band's seventh album, Octopus (1995), on 6 March 1995. A ballad, the song differs from all previous Human League tracks as the lead vocal is performed by band member Susan Ann Sulley, with spoken-word refrains from Oakey and contrasting backing from the third member, Joanne Catherall. The song received positive reviews from music critics and peaked at number 13 on the UK Singles Chart, eventually spending eight weeks in the charts. In 2001, The Guardian newspaper called it one of the best love songs of the 1990s.

Critical reception
Dave Thompson of AllMusic said "One Man in My Heart" "could have been a total throwaway, a gloopy little love song without a single redeeming quality, beloved by grannies and tweenies, gag-inducing for those outside those age parameters. But the band obviously gave the number time and attention, and thus ensured that it can't be so easily dismissed." He added that "the group produced a love song unlike virtually all typical pop fodder." Larry Flick from Billboard were also highly favourable, writing that "this sophomore single from the act's comeback album Octopus needs no apologies for its innocent composition. It is a beautiful ballad that should set top 40 afire." Steve Baltin from Cash Box commented, "Given that it’s impossible to write off the trio, even though this song also seems stuck in a time warp. While other bands from the era, specifically Duran Duran and Adam Ant, have reinvented their sound, the Human League have actually regressed, being more keyboard based than in their initial run. Still, there is something cute about the tune."

Anderson Jones from Entertainment Weekly described it as "melodramatic synth-pop-orchestrated". Music writer and columnist James Masterton noted that it is unusually featuring Joanne and Suzan on vocals completely on their own. "The result is a tender woman's ballad to which the expression 'lovely' could almost be said to have been coined." A reviewer from Music Week rated it four out of five, describing it as "a gorgeous semi-ballad that could be ABBA if you didn't know better." Criticism of Susan Ann Sulley's vocals was that she was too technically proficient making her sound "bland"; one critic declared that he missed "the rough edges of the girl plucked from the Sheffield dance floor".

Music video

The accompanying music video for "One Man in My Heart" has a similar cinematography style to the video for the previous single Tell Me When and had the same director, Andy Morahan. It is set in a Parisian cafe and principally features (for this song) lead vocalist Susan Ann Sulley sat on her own having a coffee while singing to herself; whilst watching the other customers. Fellow band members Philip Oakey and Joanne Catherall are seated elsewhere in the cafe and the camera pans to them for their backing vocals and Oakey's incidental spoken words.

Known in the media for her regular dramatic style changes Sulley had the look of an elegant business woman for the video. Sulley always insists that she "doesn’t dress up for music videos" and the style seen on screen is how she could be found in her daily life. She changed her style again before the next music video later that year.
The video received considerable play on VH1

Track listings

 UK CD1 
 "One Man in My Heart" – 4:03
 "One Man in My Heart" (T.O.E.C. extended) – 8:29
 "One Man in My Heart" (T.O.E.C. unplugged) – 4:15
 "These Are the Days" (Sonic Radiation) – 7:03

 UK CD2 
 "These Are the Days" (Ba Ba mix) – 6:10
 "These Are the Days" (Overworld mix) – 6:25
 "These Are the Days" (Man With No Name vocal) – 6:52
 "One Man in My Heart" (T.O.E.C. Nasty Sue mix) – 5:32

 UK 12-inch single 
A1. "These Are the Days" (Ba Ba mix) – 6:09
A2. "These Are the Days" (symphonic Ba Ba mix) – 6:01
B1. "These Are the Days" (Man with No Name instrumental) – 6:51
B2. "One Man in My Heart" (T.O.E.C. unplugged) – 4:15

 UK cassette single 
 "One Man in My Heart"
 "These Are the Days" (Sonic Radiation)

 European CD single 
 "One Man in My Heart" – 4:03
 "One Man in My Heart" (T.O.E.C. extended) – 8:29

 European maxi-CD single 
 "One Man in My Heart" – 4:03
 "One Man in My Heart" (T.O.E.C. radio edit) – 3:46
 "One Man in My Heart" (T.O.E.C. unplugged) – 4:15
 "These Are the Days" (Sonic Radiation) – 7:03

 US cassette single 
A. "One Man in My Heart" (LP version) – 4:03
B. "These Are the Days" (Overworld mix) – 6:25

Charts

References

External links
 www.susanne-sulley.net

1995 singles
1995 songs
East West Records singles
The Human League songs
Music videos directed by Andy Morahan
Song recordings produced by Ian Stanley
Songs written by Neil Sutton
Songs written by Philip Oakey